The Conference on Artificial General Intelligence is a meeting of researchers in the field of Artificial General Intelligence organized by the AGI Society and held annually since 2008. The conference was initiated by the 2006 Bethesda Artificial General Intelligence Workshop and has been hosted at the University of Memphis (sponsored by the AAAI); Arlington, Virginia (sponsored by the AAAI and Ray Kurzweil's KurzweilAI.net); Lugano, Switzerland (In Memoriam Ray Solomonoff and sponsored by the AAAI and KurzweilAI); Google headquarters in Mountain View, California (sponsored by Google, Inc., the AAAI, and KurzweilAI); the University of Oxford, United Kingdom (sponsored by the Future of Humanity Institute and KurzweilAI); and at Peking University, Beijing, China (sponsored by the Cognitive Science Society and the AAAI), Quebec City, Canada (sponsored by the Cognitive Science Society and the AAAI). The AGI-15 conference was held in Berlin, Germany.

The conference has attracted many speakers over the years including Joscha Bach, John L. Pollock, Nicholas L. Cassimatis, Bill Hibbard, Hugo de Garis, Stan Franklin, Steve Omohundro, Ben Goertzel, Itamar Arel, Eric Baum, Marcus Hutter, John E. Laird, Stephen R. Reed, Jürgen Schmidhuber, Richard S. Sutton, Randal A. Koene, Ernst Dickmanns, Peter Norvig, Yoshua Bengio, Zhongzhi Shi, Margaret Boden, David Hanson, Angelo Cangelosi, François Chollet, Gary Marcus, Roman Yampolskly, and Nick Bostrom.

References

External links
 AGI Conference website
 AGI-11  opening remarks, GoogleTechTalks on YouTube - Moshe Looks and Peter Norvig
 AGI-13 talks, presentations, and tutorials.

Artificial intelligence conferences